A Tribal Lending Enterprise (TLE) is a type of American financial services and lending organization owned and operated by a federally-recognized Native American tribal government. Native American tribal governments have established TLEs to further expand their business portfolios beyond traditional industries associated with tribal economies, such as gaming, payday lending, natural resources, and government contracting. Native American tribal lending is often operated through an online hub, based on sovereign tribal land, and offering loans to consumers (government-to-consumer lending).

History 
Native American tribes have diversified revenue streams in internet-based consumer lending through tribal lending enterprises that are often financed by a third (outside) party. As arms of the tribe, tribal lending entities benefit from the tribes' sovereign immunity in relation to state-based consumer lending regulation; "as nations that predate the Constitution and the United States, tribal nations can generally operate in licensed environments independent of state regulation."

Controversies 
Some critics of short-term lending have alleged that American Indian tribes do not benefit from their lending businesses, and that the businesses are a loophole allowing "payday lending firms affiliating with Native American tribes and taking advantage of tribal sovereignty to offer loans online that would otherwise be blocked by many US state laws." Leaders in American Indian tribal lending have rejected these allegations of their tribes being "rented" for private parties for profit at the expense of tribal members. The Native American Financial Services Association has referred to these allegations as "offensive to all Native Americans". Some members of Congress have agreed, and in 2013, a letter signed by 31 congressmen and women opposed a federal crackdown on tribal lenders. Multiple court cases have also reinforced tribes' ability to operate these businesses. Many tribes have made the strategic business decision to outsource which has created a peak for tribe gaming as of 2018. Because of this, online tribal lending has become a key economic tool for American Indian Tribes.

In July 2020, the United States Court of Appeals for the Third Circuit found that the Otoe–Missouria Tribe of Indians payday lender could not compel arbitration to defeat a Racketeer Influenced and Corrupt Organizations Act lawsuit brought by borrowers because the choice of law clause in the loans had adopted only the tribe's own law. The company settled the class action lawsuit in 2021, which had alleged illegal predatory lending for $182 million, including $86 million in cash and $76 million in loan cancellation.

Examples 
Examples of Tribal Lending Enterprises include the Turtle Mountain Band of Chippewa Indians, Picayune Rancheria of Chukchansi Indians, Plain Green Loans, Chippewa Cree and others.

References 

Financial services in the United States
History of indigenous peoples of North America
Native American topics
Payday loan companies
United States Bureau of Indian Affairs
United States federal Native American legislation